David John Tune  (born 1954) is a retired senior Australian public servant. Between 2009 and 2014 he was Secretary of the Australian Government Finance Department.

Life and career
Tune joined the Australian Public Service in 1976.

Between 1986 and 1988 he worked on a secondment in the British Cabinet Office.

In August 2009, Tune was appointed Secretary of the Department of Finance and Deregulation. While Secretary of that Department in 2013, Tune was forced to sign off controversial tax-funded advertising intended to deter asylum seekers from making the journey to Australia by boat, during the care-taker period before an election.

Tune announced his retirement from the public service in May 2014, with his last day as Finance Secretary announced for 27 June. Tune served 38 years in public service.

In August 2015, Tune was appointed to co-chair a review into parliamentary entitlements, following intense scrutiny on the spending habits of politicians, and the resignation of Bronwyn Bishop as Speaker over her use of entitlements. In the review, Tune and his colleague John Conde proposed a new "principles-based" system and recommended the language of "entitlements" be renamed "work expenses".

Awards
Tune was awarded the Public Service Medal in 2009 for outstanding public service in the development of significant economic and social policy reforms in a way that models whole-of-government service. Six years later at the 2015 Australia Day Honours, Tune was appointed an Officer of the Order of Australia for distinguished service to public administration through leadership of finance, budget and social policy initiatives, as an adviser to government, and through disaster recovery coordination and liaison.

References

Living people
1954 births
Officers of the Order of Australia
Recipients of the Public Service Medal (Australia)
Secretaries of the Australian Department of Finance
Date of birth missing (living people)
Place of birth missing (living people)